Exeter  is a constituency composed of the cathedral city and county town of Devon represented in the House of Commons of the UK Parliament.    The constituency has had a history of representatives from 1900 of Conservative, Liberal Party, Independent and Labour representation.

History
The constituency has been held by Labour since 1997.

The Labour Party currently has a majority of over 10,000, suggesting this is a safe seat for the party.

Constituency profile

The constituency covers the majority of this affluent city, including the University and the Met Office which are significant employers.

Boundaries 

1918–1950: The County Borough of Exeter.

1950–1974: As prior but with redrawn boundaries.

1974–1983: As prior but with redrawn boundaries.

1983–2010: The City of Exeter.

2010–present: The City of Exeter wards of Alphington, Cowick, Duryard, Exwick, Heavitree, Mincinglake, Newtown, Pennsylvania, Pinhoe, Polsloe, Priory, St David's, St James, St Leonard's, St Thomas, and Whipton and Barton.

The constituency covers most of the city of Exeter in Devon. It covered the entire city from 1918 until 2010, when, under the Fifth Periodic Review of Westminster constituencies, which increased the number of seats in the county from 11 to 12, two wards of the City of Exeter (St Loyes and Topsham) were transferred to the neighbouring East Devon constituency.

Members of Parliament

MPs 1295–1660

MPs 1660–1885

Two members

MPs since 1885

Elections

Elections in the 2010s

Elections in the 2000s

Elections in the 1990s

Elections in the 1980s

Elections in the 1970s

Elections in the 1960s

Elections in the 1950s

Election in the 1940s

Elections in the 1930s
General Election 1939–40:
Another General Election was required to take place before the end of 1940. The political parties had been making preparations for an election to take place and by the Autumn of 1939, the following candidates had been selected; 
Conservative: Arthur Reed
Labour: William Robert Robins
Liberal: Henry Gebhardt 
British Union: Rafe Temple Cotton

Elections in the 1920s

Election results 1885-1918

Elections in the 1880s

Elections in the 1890s

Elections in the 1900s

Elections in the 1910s 

Upon petition, this election was subject to a recount due to the closeness of the results. On the first count, St. Maur led with 4,786 votes to Duke's 4,782. On a second count, St. Maur again led with 4,782 votes to Duke's 4,778. Closer scrutiny led to the above count, allowing Duke to retain the seat.

General Election 1914–15:

Another General Election was required to take place before the end of 1915. The political parties had been making preparations for an election to take place and by July 1914, the following candidates had been selected; 
Unionist: Henry Duke
Liberal:

Duke is appointed Chief Secretary to the Lord Lieutenant of Ireland, prompting a by-election.

Duke is appointed Lord Justice of Appeal and resigns, prompting a by-election.

Election results 1868-1880

Elections in the 1860s

 
 

 
 
 

Coleridge was appointed Solicitor General for England and Wales, requiring a by-election.

Elections in the 1870s
Coleridge resigned after being appointed Chief Justice of the Court of Common Pleas

Elections in the 1880s

Election results 1832-1868

Elections in the 1830s

Elections in the 1840s

 
 

Follett was appointed Solicitor General of England and Wales, requiring a by-election.

Follett was appointed Attorney General of England and Wales, requiring a by-election.

 

Follett's death caused a by-election.

Elections in the 1850s

Elections in the 1860s
Divett's death caused a by-election.

Elections before 1832

See also 
 List of parliamentary constituencies in Devon

Notes

References

Parliamentary constituencies in Devon
Constituencies of the Parliament of the United Kingdom established in 1295
Politics of Exeter